The Judo Competition for men and women at the 1987 Pan American Games was held from August 7 to August 23, 1987 in Indianapolis, United States. There were eight weight divisions for both men and women.

Medal table

Men's competition

Bantamweight (-60 kg)

Featherweight (-65 kg)

Lightweight (-71 kg)

Light Middleweight (-78 kg)

Middleweight (-86 kg)

Light Heavyweight (-95 kg)

Heavyweight (+95 kg)

Open

Women's competition

Extra Lightweight (-48 kg)

Half Lightweight (-52 kg)

Lightweight (-56 kg)

Half Middleweight (-61 kg)

Middleweight (-66 kg)

Half Heavyweight (-72 kg)

Heavyweight (+72 kg)

Open

References
 Sports 123

American Games
1987
Events at the 1987 Pan American Games
Judo competitions in the United States
International sports competitions hosted by the United States